Erwin Schild  (born March 9, 1920) is a German-born Canadian Conservative rabbi and author.

Biography
Born in Cologne, Germany, a Holocaust survivor of the Dachau concentration camp, he is the author of World Through My Window and his autobiography The very narrow bridge: a memoir of an uncertain passage.  In September 1947, he became the Rabbi of Adath Israel Congregation in Toronto, Ontario and was appointed Rabbi Emeritus upon his retirement in 1989.

In 2001, he was made a Member of the Order of Canada, Canada's highest civilian honour, for "improving dialogue between the Christian and Jewish faiths, promoting harmony at home and abroad". In 2000, he was awarded the Officer's Cross (Offizierkreuz) of the Order of Merit of the Federal Republic of Germany.

References

1920 births
Living people
Canadian Conservative rabbis
Canadian non-fiction writers
German emigrants to Canada
Jewish Canadian writers
Members of the Order of Canada
Officers Crosses of the Order of Merit of the Federal Republic of Germany
Dachau concentration camp survivors
20th-century Canadian rabbis
Canadian centenarians
German centenarians
Men centenarians